Lee Dunne (21 December 1934 – 11 April 2021) was an Irish author, best known for his novel Goodbye to the Hill set in the Mountpleasant Buildings in the Hill Area, Ranelagh, Dublin.

Early life
Christopher Lee Dunne was born in 1934, the fourth of seven children born to Mick and Katy Dunne of Mount Pleasant Buildings, a tenement slum in the area known
as “The Hill” in Ranelagh, Dublin City, Ireland. A memoir of his early life in Dublin, Goodbye to the Hill, was an instant bestseller and scandalised the country 
with its frank depiction of sex and alcohol.

Writing career
The Dublin-born writer was best known for his first novel, Goodbye to the Hill (1965), a semi-autobiographical account of a rebellious young man growing up in poverty in 1950s Dublin. It was an instant success and caused great controversy for its frank depiction of sex and alcohol. Paddy Maguire, the lead character was described by one critic as “an ambitious chancer – making up in sex and scheming what he lacked in breeding”.

His second novel, the semi-autobiographical A Bed in the Sticks, documented his time as a travelling entertainer.

Reception
Dunne was described as the "most banned author in Ireland", with one of his novels being the last pieces of literature to be banned, in 1976.

Dunne’s third novel, Paddy Maguire Is Dead (1972), a graphic account of an Irish man’s descent into alcoholism, was banned in Ireland. 
In an appearance on RTÉ’s The Late Late Show, Dunne called the censor a cretin, which led to the banning of his next six books. Dunne appealed the decision of 
the Irish Censorship Board and was represented in court by barrister and future president of Ireland Mary Robinson. After his appeal was rejected, he provocatively
handed out free copies of his books to the public on Grafton Street, daring gardaí to arrest him.

Dunne was a major writer of radio scripts for RTÉ. His Harbour Hotel series, set in the fishing village of Kilmahon, tackled the moral questions of the day with humour and vivid storytelling.

Altogether Dunne wrote some 2,000 scripts for RTÉ. At one stage it seemed that virtually all the fiction produced on RTÉ was by Dunne.

Dunne died on 11 April 2021, at the age of 86.

References 

1934 births
2021 deaths
Irish writers
Place of birth missing